In God's Name: An Investigation into the Murder of Pope John Paul I is a book by David A. Yallop about the death of Pope John Paul I. It was published in 1984 by Bantam Books.

Potential danger
Yallop proposes the theory that the pope was in "potential danger" because of corruption in the Istituto per le Opere di Religione (IOR, Institute of Religious Works, the Vatican's financial institution, commonly known as the Vatican Bank), which owned many shares in Banco Ambrosiano. The Vatican Bank lost about a quarter of a billion US dollars.

References
In God's Name: An Investigation into the Murder of Pope John Paul I, David Yallop. New York: Bantam Books, 1984, 

Pope John Paul I
Books about popes
1984 non-fiction books
1984 in Christianity